Richard E. Davis (1926 – October 6, 2015) founded KC Masterpiece barbecue sauce.

Davis began his career as a child psychiatrist, instructor and author.  His academic posts included appointments as professor and acting chairman of the department of psychiatry at Eastern Virginia Medical School, and later, as dean of the school of medicine at the University of North Dakota.  He was the creator of K.C. Masterpiece Barbecue Sauce.  In 1986, he sold the sauce to the Kingsford division of Clorox Inc.

Early life and education 
Davis, born in Joplin, Missouri, graduated from Topeka High School in 1944, and served a year and a half in the army. After World War II, he attended Washburn University, Columbia University, and Colorado College.  While at Washburn, he was initiated into the Kansas Beta Chapter of Phi Delta Theta.  He received a medical degree from the University of Kansas in 1954.

Academic and medical career 
Board Certified Adult and Child Psychiatrist.

Board examiner in psychiatry and neurology 1972–1986.

Co-academic founder as associate dean of the Eastern Virginia Medical School in Norfolk, Virginia.

Vice-president of health affairs and dean of the medical school at the University of North Dakota, where he helped it gain accreditation as a four-year medical school.

Published in the American Journal of Psychiatry, Davis identified manic-depressive [bi-polar] syndrome in childhood and its treatment.  In 1983, he presented the use of lithium as a treatment at The World Congress of Psychiatry in Vienna.

Business 
In 1977, he moved to Kansas City and began marketing various culinary concepts, including Muschup (a combination of ketchup and mustard), Dilled Muschup, and K.C. Soul Style Barbecue Sauce.

While Muschup and Dilled Muschup sold well, the barbecue sauce was the most popular, 3,000 cases of it quickly selling in Kansas City.  He later changed its name to KC Masterpiece Barbecue Sauce.

In 1986, he sold the sauce to the Kingsford division of the Clorox company, which took the barbecue sauce nationwide.  Presently it is claimed by the manufacturer to be the number 1 selling premium barbecue sauce in the country. He retained the rights to use the sauce at restaurants he was to develop. At one time several restaurants were in operation, but all have since closed.

A barbecue (dubbed the Congressional Picnic) is held annually on the south lawn of the White House. It is open to the president and vice president, all representatives and senators, and their families. Davis and his sons twice prepared barbecues for the Congressional Picnic, once for George H. W. Bush in 1992 and then for George W. Bush in 2004.

Unfinished business 
Food World:  An Idea With Global Proportions For Kansas City.  The Kansas City Star.  Dirck Steimel.  February 28, 1990.

Music 
A child prodigy on the piano, Davis composed many jazz and blues numbers.  He created the words and music for the Youth Volunteer Corps of America's anthem. He also composed Two Piano Sonata on Themes, transcribed by Wally Bradford and performed at several Midwestern universities. In 1992 Davis recorded a two-piano jazz session with Grammy nominee Jay McShann.

Honors and awards
 UMKC Henry W. Bloch School of Management Regional Entrepreneur of the Year 1995: Rich Davis, K.C. Masterpiece Barbecue 
 Founding chairman of the board of the Youth Volunteer Corps of America.
 Founding chairman of the Alliance for Epilepsy Research board.
 Davis was awarded the Distinguished Service Citation from the University of Kansas in 2002.
 Stop the Violence Coalition award, the Kindest Kansas Citian Award.  1991.
 Dr. Davis and wife Coleen were honored with the Salvation Army William Booth Award in 1993.
 American Royal Barbecue Hall of Fame Legacy Inductee 
 KC Masterpiece won the prestigious “Best Sauce on the Planet” award at the American Royal Barbecue Sauce Contest in 1980.

Books and articles
 The All American Barbecue Book (1988) Rich Davis & Shifra Stein, Vintage Books, Random House
 All About Bar-B-Q Kansas City Style (1985) Rich Davis & Shifra Stein, Barbacoa Press
 Grill Wars, Forbes Magazine, June 16, 1986
 Best Barbecued Ribs, Ladies Home Journal, August, 1984. (Rich Davis)
 Kansas City Styled Barbecue Ribs, Playboy Magazine, August 1985. (Rich Davis)
 People Magazine,  August 19, 1985. Vol. 24, No. 8. Dr. Rich Davis Gave Up Psychiatry to Put His Own Brand on Kansas City's Best Barbecue Sauce
 Dr. Rich Davis, the Sauce Doctor—R.I.P.   Barbecuebible.com. By Steven Raichlen.  
 The Kansas City Star.  Rich Davis, founder of KC Masterpiece and barbecue legend, dies.  
 Legacy.com.

References

External links
 KC Masterpiece television commercial: https://www.youtube.com/watch?v=H61GBmxFR_I
 American Royal Hall of Fame Biography http://www.barbecuehalloffame.com/p/getconnected/legacy-inductees/236
 KC Masterpiece founder Rich Davis passes away at 89.  Fox 4 Kansas City.  

1926 births
2015 deaths
American psychiatrists
People from Kansas City, Missouri
University of North Dakota faculty